The following highways are numbered 875:

United States